Libellula cyanea, the spangled skimmer,  is a species of dragonfly in the genus Libellula, native to the United States of America. Males have a blue thorax and abdomen.

The females are brown with yellow stripes. They also have clear wings with brown wing tips.

References 

  BugGuide.net

Libellulidae
Odonata of North America
Insects of the United States
Fauna of the Eastern United States
Fauna of the Plains-Midwest (United States)
Insects described in 1775
Taxa named by Johan Christian Fabricius